Tommaso Di Bartolomeo (born 4 January 2001) is an Italian rugby union player, currently playing for Italian Top10 team Petrarca and for United Rugby Championship side Zebre Parma. His preferred position is hooker.

He made his debut in the same match, coming on as a replacement.

In 2021 Di Bartolomeo was named in Italy U20s squad for the annual Six Nations Under 20s Championship. On 8 December he was named in Emerging Italy 27-man squad also for the 2021 end-of-year rugby union internationals. On 26 May hw was called in Italy A squad for the South African tour in the 2022 mid-year rugby union tests against Namibia and Currie Cup XV team.

References

2001 births
Living people
Italian rugby union players
Petrarca Rugby players
Zebre Parma players
Rugby union hookers